Colonel Templer may refer to:
RMAS Colonel Templer (A229), an acoustic research vessel of the Royal Maritime Auxiliary Service
James Templer (balloon aviator), a colonel in the British Army